The 1983 National Invitation Tournament was the 1983 edition of the annual NCAA college basketball competition.

Selected teams
Thirty-two teams accepted invitations to the tournament.

 Alabama State
 Arizona State
 Bowling Green
 Cal State Fullerton
 DePaul
 East Tennessee State
 Fordham
 Fresno State
 Idaho
 Iona
 LSU
 Michigan State
 Minnesota
 Mississippi
 Murray State
 Nebraska
 New Orleans
 Northwestern
 Notre Dame
 Old Dominion
 Oregon State
 St. Bonaventure
 South Carolina
 South Florida
 TCU
 UTEP
 Tulane
 Tulsa
 Vanderbilt
 Virginia Tech
 Wake Forest
 William & Mary

Bracket
Below are the four first round brackets, along with the four-team championship bracket.

Semifinals & finals

See also
 1983 National Women's Invitational Tournament
 1983 NCAA Division I men's basketball tournament
 1983 NCAA Division II men's basketball tournament
 1983 NCAA Division III men's basketball tournament
 1983 NCAA Division I women's basketball tournament
 1983 NCAA Division II women's basketball tournament
 1983 NCAA Division III women's basketball tournament
 1983 NAIA Division I men's basketball tournament
 1983 NAIA Division I women's basketball tournament

References

National Invitation
National Invitation Tournament
1980s in Manhattan
College basketball tournaments in New York (state)
Madison Square Garden
National Invitation Tournament
National Invitation Tournament
Basketball competitions in New York City
Sports in Manhattan